Alun Ffred Jones (born 29 October 1949) is a Welsh politician and member of Plaid Cymru and former television producer, writer and director. Jones was the National Assembly for Wales Member for Caernarfon 2003–07 and for the newly created Arfon constituency from 2007 until he stood down in 2016. He served as Minister for Heritage between 2008 and 2011 as part of the One Wales Government. In 2008 he made history by being the first UK representative to speak in the Welsh language at a meeting of the European Union. He was Chairman of Plaid Cymru from October 2019 until he resigned in July 2022.

Background
Jones was born in Brynamman and is the brother of former Plaid Cymru President and folk singer Dafydd Iwan. He is also the brother of the actor, the late Huw Ceredig. He was educated at the University of Wales, Bangor. Before his election, he was a television director and producer for Ffilmiau'r Nant and a BAFTA Cymru winner as co-writer of the S4C Welsh language comedy series, C’mon Midffild!. Before that he was a Welsh teacher and Head of Department and then a journalist with HTV. Jones speaks Welsh, English and French.

Political career
Jones is the former Leader of Gwynedd County Council and is the chair of Nantlle Vale Football Club.  His main political interests are in broadcasting, community development and the economy. On 22 July 2008 he was appointed Minister for Heritage in the Welsh Labour/Plaid Cymru coalition Welsh Assembly Government, and in this role he was active in obtaining approval for the Welsh Language (Wales) Measure 2011.

On 20 November 2008, Jones became the first person to use the Welsh language as a representative of the UK government at a European Union meeting in Brussels.

Jones resigned as Plaid chairman in July 2022 over the party's handling of Jonathan Edwards readmission to the party after being suspended for two years.

References

External links
Alun Ffred Jones AM website
Plaid Cymru Website

Offices held

1949 births
Living people
Councillors in Wales
Plaid Cymru politicians
Alumni of Bangor University
Plaid Cymru members of the Senedd
Members of the Welsh Assembly Government
Wales AMs 2003–2007
Wales AMs 2007–2011
Wales AMs 2011–2016
Welsh-speaking politicians
People from Brynamman